is a railway station on Kintetsu Minami Osaka Line in Abeno-ku, Osaka, Japan.  The station is also called "Abenobashi Station" (あべの橋駅).

According to the research on November 13, 2012, 159,075 passengers got on and off trains at Ōsaka Abenobashi Station.  It was the largest number of passengers getting on and off trains at stations on the Kintetsu Lines.

The west ticket gates of the station were shifted 35 m to the east on March 20, 2009, so that station facilities are entirely within the Kintetsu Abeno department store's "new" (east) building. The "old" (western) portion was demolished to make way for a new high-rise building.

Connecting lines
Tennoji Station
West Japan Railway Company (JR West)
Osaka Loop Line
Hanwa Line
Yamatoji Line
Osaka Metro
Midosuji Line (M23)
Tanimachi Line (T27)
Tennoji-eki-mae Station
Hankai Tramway Uemachi Line

Layout
The station has six bay platforms serving five tracks on the first floor.

Train services from 11 a.m. till 4 p.m.
Weekdays
1 limited express train to Yoshino
2 express trains to Yoshino
6 semi-express trains to Furuichi, of which 2 continue to Kashiharajingu-mae and other 4 to Kawachi-Nagano 
6 local trains to Fujiidera, of which 1 or 2 continue to Furuichi
Weekends and holidays
2 limited express trains to Yoshino
2 express trains to Yoshino
6 semi-express trains to Furuichi, of which 2 continue to Kashiharajingu-mae and other 4 to Kawachi-Nagano 
6 local trains to Fujiidera, of which 1 or 2 continue to Furuichi

Establishments around the station
Abenobashi Terminal Building (Abeno Harukas Tower Building, Abeno Harukas Wing Building, East Building)
Kintetsu Department Store Main Store Abeno Harukas
Offices
Osaka Marriott Miyako Hotel
Abeno Harukas Art Museum
Harukas 300
Miyako City Osaka Tennoji
Hoop
and
Abeno Apollo Building, Abeno Lucias (Both are owned by Kin-ei Corp.)
Tennoji MiO
Main Building
Plaza Building
abeno CUES TOWN
Tennoji Park
Tennoji Zoo
Osaka Municipal Museum of Art
Shitennō-ji

The skyscraper "Abeno Harukas" opened on March 7, 2014. The department store floors pre-opened on June 13, 2013, and February 22, 2014.

Bus stops

Transit buses

Amenobashi-nishi Bus Stop located in front of Apollo Building is available for bus routes 48, 52 and 80.

Expressway buses

Airport limousine

References

Stations next to Ōsaka Abenobashi

Abeno-ku, Osaka
Railway stations in Japan opened in 1923
Railway stations in Osaka